Joy Hearn (born February 17, 1958) is an American politician and a Democratic member of the Rhode Island House of Representatives representing District 66 since January 2009.

Education
Hearn earned her BA degree from State University of New York at Geneseo.

Elections
2012 Hearn was unopposed for the September 11, 2012 Democratic Primary, winning with 856 votes and was unopposed for the November 6, 2012 General election, winning with 4,155 votes (55.5%) against Republican nominee Manfred Diel and Independent candidate Eugene Saveory.
2008 When District 66 Republican Representative Susan Story retired and left the seat open, Hearn was unopposed for the September 9, 2008 Democratic Primary, winning with 271 votes and won the November 4, 2008 General election with 4,160 votes (55.1%) against Republican nominee Margaret Kane.
2010 Hearn and returning 2010 Republican opponent Margaret Kane were both unopposed for their September 23, 2010 primaries, setting up a rematch; Hearn won the three-way November 2, 2010 General election with 2,974 votes (47.3%) against Kane and Independent candidate Joel Hellmann, who had run for the District 88 seat in 1998.

References

External links
Official page at the Rhode Island General Assembly

Joy Hearn at Ballotpedia
Joy Hearn at the National Institute on Money in State Politics

Place of birth missing (living people)
1958 births
Living people
Democratic Party members of the Rhode Island House of Representatives
People from Barrington, Rhode Island
State University of New York at Geneseo alumni
Women state legislators in Rhode Island
21st-century American politicians
21st-century American women politicians